La Niñera may refer to:

 La Niñera (Argentine TV series), an Argentine  sitcom, based on the U.S. TV series The Nanny
 La niñera (Mexican TV series), a Mexican sitcom, based on the U.S. TV series The Nanny

See also
 List of foreign adaptations of The Nanny